Chełchy may refer to the following places:
Chełchy, Masovian Voivodeship (east-central Poland)
Chełchy, Podlaskie Voivodeship (north-east Poland)
Chełchy, Ełk County in Warmian-Masurian Voivodeship (north Poland)
Chełchy, Gmina Kowale Oleckie in Warmian-Masurian Voivodeship (north Poland)
Chełchy, Gmina Świętajno in Warmian-Masurian Voivodeship (north Poland)